San Antonio is a seaside locality in Uruguay, Rocha Department.

Geography
The town is located near Route 10, near the seaside resort city of La Paloma.

Climate 
San Antonio is in the Southern Hemisphere's temperate zone and has four seasons. Temperatures average 21 °C to 27 °C (70 °F to 80 °F) in summer and 10 °C and 16 °C (50 °F to 60 °F) in winter.

Population 
In 2011 San Antonio had a population of 6 permanent inhabitants. During the summer season the number or residents is increased significantly due to tourism.

References

External links 
 Instituto Nacional de Estadística: Plan of San Antonio

Populated places in the Rocha Department
Seaside resorts in Uruguay